Merey is an Afro-Asiatic language spoken in northern Cameroon. Dugur is a dialect.

The Merey [meri] (10,000 speakers) live in the Méri massif, located immediately west of the town of Méri (Méri canton, Méri commune, Diamaré department, Far North region).

Notes 

Biu-Mandara languages
Languages of Cameroon